Verdell is an uncommon proper name which comes from the French vert, Spanish verde/verdal, Latin viride, meaning green and growing.

Verdell may also refer to:
 Verdell Primeaux, a Native American singer
 Verdell Smith, an American boxer
 a dog in the 1997 film As Good as It Gets